"Wot" is a 1982 single by English musician Captain Sensible released by A&M Records. The song was produced by Tony Mansfield and features the group Dolly Mixture on backing vocals. The song charted in the United Kingdom and was a specialist hit in the United States, but enjoyed its greatest success in continental Europe.

Production
"Wot" is a song written by Captain Sensible and produced by Tony Mansfield. The song features backing vocals from Dolly Mixture.

Captain described the song's creation in a SFX Magazine interview: - While the Damned were touring in the USA, he heard this horrible pounding sound coming from outside at 5am. It was coming from a building site and as it was so early and he wanted to sleep in the hotel, he recorded the noise to make a complaint. He played it to the reception, informing them that it was disgusting and a ploy to upset British bands, and he was trying to get some sleep. and they just said, "Have a nice day". Nothing was done and he got no sleep. When he returned to the UK, he played the tape to Tony Mansfield who took the tape and created a loop (backing track) from it within about 10 minutes. This sound loop formed the basis of the song. The loop can be heard clearly at the beginning and near the end of the song. The song's lyrics were also based on this lack of sleep and noisy events. Captain added that they simply "added more rubbish on top of the track" to build up the song.

The song was originally going to be called "Cap's Rap".

Genre
AllMusic's Stephen Cook described "Wot" as "Sugarhill Gang-inspired new wave disco". Stephen "Spaz" Schnee from the same website called the song a "radio-friendly [slice] of lighthearted keyboard-based pop".

Release
"Wot" was released on A&M Records. In the United Kingdom, "Wot" was in the United Kingdom charts for seven weeks, peaking at number 26. In the United States, "Wot" peaked on Billboards's Hot Dance Club Play Singles chart at number 24. In France, the single was certified gold by the Syndicat National de l'Édition Phonographique (SNEP).

"Wot" was performed by Captain Sensible on Top of the Pops with Dolly Mixture as the backing group. Dolly Mixture had mixed feelings about appearing on Top of the Pops so often as it led to them being recognized more as backup musicians than for their own work.

Reception
Online music database AllMusic described both the songs "Wot" and "A Nice Cup of Tea" as "well-crafted pop tunes that deliver the goods".

Credits
Credits adapted from Wot record sleeve.
 Mark Proctor – engineer
 Matthew Fisher – engineer
 Andy Gierus – assistant engineer
 Janette Beckman – photography
 Tony Mansfield – producer

Chart performance

Weekly charts

Year-end charts

References

1982 singles
1982 songs
Captain Sensible songs
A&M Records singles
Song recordings produced by Tony Mansfield
Songs written by Captain Sensible
British disco songs
English pop songs